Thomas Mitscherlich (11 December 1942 – 18 March 1998) was a German film director and screenwriter. He directed ten films between 1972 and 1996. His 1993 film Just a Matter of Duty was entered into the 43rd Berlin International Film Festival.

Selected filmography
 Just a Matter of Duty (1993)
 Journey Into Life: Aftermath of a Childhood in Auschwitz (1996)

References

External links

1942 births
1998 deaths
Mass media people from Heidelberg
German documentary film directors
Film people from Baden-Württemberg